Dan Shechtman (born January 24, 1941) is the Philip Tobias Professor of Materials Science at the Technion – Israel Institute of Technology, an Associate of the US Department of Energy's Ames National Laboratory, and Professor of Materials Science at Iowa State University. On April 8, 1982, while on sabbatical at the U.S. National Bureau of Standards in Washington, D.C., Shechtman discovered the icosahedral phase, which opened the new field of quasiperiodic crystals.  

He was awarded the 2011 Nobel Prize in Chemistry for the discovery of quasicrystals, making him one of six Israelis who have won the Nobel Prize in Chemistry.

Biography
Dan Shechtman was born in 1941 in Tel Aviv, in what was then Mandatory Palestine; the city became part of the new state of Israel in 1948. He grew up in Petah Tikva and Ramat Gan. His grandparents had immigrated to Palestine during the  Second Aliyah (1904–1914) and founded a printing house. As a child Shechtman was fascinated by Jules Verne's The Mysterious Island (1874), which he read many times. His childhood dream was to become an engineer like the main protagonist, Cyrus Smith.

I thought that was the best thing a person could do. The engineer in the book knows mechanics and physics, and he creates a whole way of life on the island out of nothing. I wanted to be like that.

Shechtman is married to Prof. Tzipora Shechtman, Head of the Department of Counseling and Human Development at Haifa University, and author of two books on psychotherapy. They have a son Yoav Shechtman (a postdoctoral researcher in the lab of W. E. Moerner) and three daughters: Tamar Finkelstein (an organizational psychologist at the Israeli police leadership center), Ella Shechtman-Cory (a PhD in clinical psychology), and Ruth Dougoud-Nevo (also a PhD in clinical psychology). He is an atheist.

Academic career

After receiving his Ph.D. in Materials Engineering from the Technion in 1972, where he also obtained his B.Sc. in Mechanical Engineering in 1966 and M.Sc. in Materials Engineering in 1968, Shechtman was an NRC fellow at the Aerospace Research Laboratories at Wright Patterson AFB, Ohio, where he studied for three years the microstructure and physical metallurgy of titanium aluminides. In 1975, he joined the department of materials engineering at Technion. In 1981–1983 he was on sabbatical at Johns Hopkins University, where he studied rapidly solidified aluminum transition metal alloys, in a joint program with NBS. During this study he discovered the icosahedral phase which opened the new field of quasiperiodic crystals.

In 1992–1994 he was on sabbatical at National Institute of Standards and Technology (NIST), where he studied the effect of the defect structure of CVD diamond on its growth and properties. Shechtman's Technion research is conducted in the Louis Edelstein Center, and in the Wolfson Centre which is headed by him. He served on several Technion Senate Committees and headed one of them.

Shechtman joined the Iowa State faculty in 2004. He currently spends about five months a year in Ames on a part-time appointment.

Since 2014 he has been the head of the International Scientific Council of Tomsk Polytechnic University.

Work on quasicrystals

From the day Shechtman published his findings on quasicrystals in 1984 to the day Linus Pauling died (1994), Shechtman experienced hostility from him toward the non-periodic interpretation. "For a long time it was me against the world," he said. "I was a subject of ridicule and lectures about the basics of crystallography. The leader of the opposition to my findings was the two-time Nobel Laureate Linus Pauling, the idol of the American Chemical Society and one of the most famous scientists in the world. For years, 'til his last day, he fought against quasi-periodicity in crystals. He was wrong, and after a while, I enjoyed every moment of this scientific battle, knowing that he was wrong."

Linus Pauling is noted saying "There is no such thing as quasicrystals, only quasi-scientists." Pauling was apparently unaware of a paper in 1981 by H. Kleinert and K. Maki which had pointed out the possibility of a non-periodic Icosahedral Phase in quasicrystals (see the
historical notes). The head of Shechtman's research group told him to "go back and read the textbook" and a couple of days later "asked him to leave for 'bringing disgrace' on the team." Shechtman felt dejected. On publication of his paper, other scientists began to confirm and accept empirical findings of the existence of quasicrystals.

The Nobel Committee at the Royal Swedish Academy of Sciences said that "his discovery was extremely controversial," but that his work "eventually forced scientists to reconsider their conception of the very nature of matter."
Through Shechtman's discovery, several other groups were able to form similar quasicrystals by 1987, finding these materials to have low thermal and electrical conductivity, while possessing high structural stability. Quasicrystals have also been found naturally.

A quasiperiodic crystal, or, in short, quasicrystal, is a structure that is ordered but not periodic. A quasicrystalline pattern can continuously fill all available space, but it lacks translational symmetry. "Aperiodic mosaics, such as those found in the medieval Islamic mosaics of the Alhambra palace in Spain and the Darb-i Imam shrine in Iran, have helped scientists understand what quasicrystals look like at the atomic level. In those mosaics, as in quasicrystals, the patterns are regular – they follow mathematical rules – but they never repeat themselves.""An intriguing feature of such patterns, [which are] also found in Arab mosaics, is that the mathematical constant known as the Greek letter , or the "golden ratio", occurs over and over again. Underlying it is a sequence worked out by Fibonacci in the 13th century, where each number is the sum of the preceding two."

Quasicrystalline materials could be used in a large number of applications, including the formation of durable steel used for fine instrumentation, and non-stick insulation for electrical wires and cooking equipment., but presently have no technological applications.

The Nobel prize was 10 million Swedish krona (approximately ).

Presidential bid
On January 17, 2014, in an interview with Israel's Channel One, Shechtman announced his candidacy for President of Israel. Shechtman received the endorsement of the ten Members of Knesset required to run. In the elections, held on June 10, 2014, he was awarded only one vote. This led Israeli press and Israeli humorists to qualify Shechtman as "quasi-president" in reference to the "quasi-scientist" quote.

Awards

 2019 Honorary John von Neumann Professor title 
 2014 Fray International Sustainability Award, SIPS 2014 
 2013 Honorary doctorate from Bar-Ilan University
 2011 Nobel Prize in Chemistry for the discovery of quasicrystals
 2008 European Materials Research Society (E-MRS) 25th Anniversary Award
 2002 EMET Prize in Chemistry
 2000 Muriel & David Jacknow Technion Award for Excellence in Teaching
 2000 Gregori Aminoff Prize of the Royal Swedish Academy of Sciences
 1999 Wolf Prize in Physics.
 1998 Israel Prize, for Physics.
 1993 Weizmann Science Award
 1990 Rothschild Prize in Engineering
 1988 New England Academic Award of the Technion
 1988 International Award for New Materials of the American Physical Society
 1986 Physics Award of the Friedenberg Fund for the Advancement of Science and Education

Published works

See also

 List of Israel Prize recipients
 List of Israeli Nobel laureates
 List of Jewish Nobel laureates
 Science and technology in Israel

References

Further reading
D. P. DiVincenzo and P. J. Steinhardt, eds. 1991. Quasicrystals: The State of the Art. Directions in Condensed Matter Physics, Vol 11. .
T. Janssen. 2007. Quasicrystals: Comparative dynamics. Nature Materials, Vol 6., 925–926.

External links

 
Nobel Laureates from Technion – Israel Institute of Technology.
Story of quasicrystals as told by Shechtman to APS News in 2002.
Biography/CV Page – Technion
TechnionLIVE e-newsletter 
Dan Shechtman (Iowa State faculty page)
2012 interview with The Times of Israel

1941 births
Nobel laureates in Chemistry
Israeli Nobel laureates
Crystallographers
Iowa State University faculty
Israel Prize in physics recipients
Israeli chemists
Israeli Jews
Israeli atheists
Israeli materials scientists
Israeli physicists
Jewish atheists
Jewish chemists
Jewish physicists
Living people
Members of the European Academy of Sciences and Arts
Members of the Israel Academy of Sciences and Humanities
Members of the United States National Academy of Engineering
Foreign Members of the Russian Academy of Sciences
EMET Prize recipients in the Exact Sciences
People from Tel Aviv
Technion – Israel Institute of Technology alumni
Academic staff of Technion – Israel Institute of Technology
Wolf Prize in Physics laureates
Articles containing video clips
Candidates for President of Israel
Quasicrystals